Frontier Battalion ( – Sākhtmān Hāī Masḵūnī Gardān Marazī) is a military station and village in Sarakhs Rural District, in the Central District of Sarakhs County, Razavi Khorasan Province, Iran. At the 2006 census, its population was 131, in 38 families.

References 

Populated places in Sarakhs County
Military installations of Iran